Ľubomíra Kalinová (born in Banská Bystrica on ) is a Slovak biathlete.

Kalinová competed in the 2010 Winter Olympics for Slovakia. Her best performance was 80th in the individual. She also finished 81st in the sprint.

As of February 2013, her best performance at the Biathlon World Championships is 13th, as part of the 2009 Slovak women's relay team. Her best individual performance is 73rd, in the 2009 individual.

As of February 2013, Kalinová's best performance in a Biathlon World Cup event is 6th, as part of the women's relay team at Oberhof in 2011/12. Her best individual result is 31st, in the sprint at Vancouver in 2008/09.  Her best overall finish in the Biathlon World Cup is 86th, in 2008/09.

References 

1982 births
Biathletes at the 2010 Winter Olympics
Slovak female biathletes
Living people
Olympic biathletes of Slovakia
Sportspeople from Banská Bystrica